The America EP is a four-song EP by American singer-songwriter Ryan Star. It was self-released for free via the internet. The songs "Orphans" and "Somebody's Son" were initially meant to be released on Star's 2010 album 11:59. 

The EP is dedicated to Star's grandfather who fought in World War II.

Track listing
All songs written by Ryan Star and Max Collins except track #4 by Tom Petty and Jeff Lynne.

"America" (4:28)
"Somebody's Son" (3:30)
"Orphans" (3:56)
"I Won't Back Down" (Tom Petty cover) (3:07)

References

2012 EPs
Ryan Star albums